Decoloniality is a school of thought that aims to delink from Eurocentric knowledge hierarchies and ways of being in the world in order to enable other forms of existence on Earth. It critiques the perceived universality of Western knowledge and the superiority of Western culture, including the systems and institutions that reinforce these perceptions. Decolonial perspectives understand colonialism as the basis for the everyday function of capitalist modernity and imperialism. Decoloniality emerged as part of a South America movement examining the role of the European colonization of the Americas in establishing Eurocentric modernity/coloniality.

Foundational principles

Coloniality of knowledge

Coloniality of power

Colonialism as the root 

The decolonial movement includes diverse forms of critical theory, articulated by pluriversal forms of liberatory thinking that arise out of distinct situations. In its academic forms, it analyzes class distinctions, ethnic studies, gender studies, and area studies. It has been described as consisting of analytic (in the sense of semiotics) and practical “options confronting and delinking from [...] the colonial matrix of power" or from a "matrix of modernity" rooted in colonialism. 

It considers colonialism "the underlying logic of the foundation and unfolding of Western civilization from the Renaissance to today," although this foundational interconnectedness is often downplayed. This logic is commonly referred to as the colonial matrix of power or coloniality of power. Some have built upon decolonial theory by proposing Critical Indigenous Methodologies for research.

Imperialism as the successor 

Although formal and explicit colonization ended with the decolonization of the Americas during the eighteenth and nineteenth century and the decolonization of much of the Global South in the late twentieth century, its successors, Western imperialism and globalization perpetuate those inequalities. The colonial matrix of power produced social discrimination eventually variously codified as racial, ethnic, anthropological or national according to specific historic, social, and geographic contexts. Decoloniality emerged as the colonial matrix of power was put into place during the 16th century. It is, in effect, a continuing confrontation of, and delinking from, Eurocentrism.

Coloniality of gender

Disobedience and de-linking 
Decoloniality has been called a form of "epistemic disobedience", "epistemic de-linking", and "epistemic reconstruction". In this sense, decolonial thinking is the recognition and implementation of a border gnosis or subaltern, a means of eliminating the provincial tendency to pretend that Western European modes of thinking are universal. In less theoretical applications—such as movements for Indigenous autonomy—decoloniality is considered a program of de-linking from contemporary legacies of coloniality, a response to needs unmet by the modern Rightist or Leftist governments, or, most broadly, social movements in search of a “new humanity” or the search for “social liberation from all power organized as inequality, discrimination, exploitation, and domination”.

Decoloniality
Frantz Fanon and Aimé Césaire contributed to decolonial thinking, theory, and practice by identifying core principles of decoloniality. The first principle they identified is that colonialism must be confronted and treated as a discourse which fundamentally frames all aspects of thinking, organization, and existence. Framing colonialism as a "fundamental problem" empowers the colonized to center their experiences and thinking without seeking the recognition of the colonizer—a step towards the creation of decolonial thinking. 

The second core principle is that decolonization goes beyond ending colonization. Nelson Maldonado-Torres explains, "For decolonial thinking decolonization is less the end of colonialism wherever it has occurred and more the project of undoing and unlearning the coloniality of power, knowledge, and being and of creating a new sense of humanity and forms of interrelationality." This is the work of the decolonial project that has epistemic, political, and ethical dimensions.

Anibal Quijano summarized the goals of decoloniality as a need to recognize that the instrumentation of reason by the colonial matrix of power produced distorted paradigms of knowledge and spoiled the liberating promises of modernity, and by that recognition, realize the destruction of the global coloniality of power. Alanna Lockward explains that Europe has engaged in an intentional "politics of confusion" to conceal the relationship between modernity and coloniality. 

Decoloniality is synonymous with decolonial "thinking and doing", and it questions or problematizes the histories of power emerging from Europe. These histories underlie the logic of Western civilization. Thus, decoloniality refers to analytic approaches and socioeconomic and political practices opposed to pillars of Western civilization: coloniality and modernity. This makes decoloniality both a political and epistemic project.

Examples 
Examples of contemporary decolonial programmatics and analytics exist throughout the Americas. Decolonial movements include the contemporary Zapatista governments of Southern Mexico, Indigenous movements for autonomy throughout South America, ALBA, CONFENIAE in Ecuador, ONIC in Colombia, the TIPNIS movement in Bolivia, and the Landless Workers' Movement in Brazil. These movements embody action oriented towards the goals expressed to seek ever-increasing freedoms by challenging the reasoning behind modernity, since modernity is in fact a facet of the colonial matrix of power.

Examples of contemporary decolonial analytics include ethnic studies programs at various educational levels designed primarily to appeal to certain ethnic groups, including those at the K-12 level recently banned in Arizona, as well as long-established university programs. Scholars primarily with analytics who fail to recognize the connection between politics or decoloniality and the production of knowledge—between programmatics and analytics—are those claimed by decolonialists to most likely to reflect "an underlying acceptance of capitalist modernity, liberal democracy, and individualism" values which decoloniality seeks to challenge.

Decolonial critique 
Researchers, authors, creators, theorists, and others engage in decoloniality through essays, artwork, and media. Many of these creators engage in decolonial critique. In decolonial critique, thinkers employ the theoretical, political, epistemic, and social frameworks advanced by decoloniality to scrutinize, reformulate, and denaturalize often widely accepted and celebrated concepts. Many decolonial critiques focus on reformulating the concept of modernity as situated within colonial and racial frameworks. Decolonial critique may inspire a decolonial culture that delinks from reproducing Western hierarchies. Decolonial critique is a method of applying decolonial methods and practices to all facets of epistemic, social, and political thinking.

Decolonial art 

Decolonial art critiques Western art for the way it is alienated from the surrounding world and its focus on pursuing aesthetic beauty. Rather than feelings of sublime at the beauty of an art object, decolonial art seeks to evoke feelings of "sadness, indignation, repentance, hope, solidarity, resolution to change the world in the future, and, most importantly, with the restoration of human dignity." Decolonial aesthetics "seek to recognize and open options for liberating the senses" beyond just visual senses and challenge "the idea of art from Eurocentric forms of expression and philosophies of the beautiful." 

Decolonial art may "re-inscribe indigeneity on the land" that has been obscured by colonialism and reveal alternatives or an "always elsewhere of colonialism." Graffiti can function as an open or public challenge to colonial or imperialist structures and disrupt notions of a contented oppressed or colonized people. This "decolonial turn" gained attention through the work of Brazilian artists in the 1960s, including Mário Pedrosa, Ferreira Gullar, Ana Bella Geiger, Lygia Pape, and Hélio Oiticica, but has been now recognized by artists across the world.

Decolonial feminism 
Decolonial feminism reformulates the coloniality of gender by critiquing the very formation of gender and its subsequent formations of patriarchy and the gender binary, not as universal constants across cultures, but as structures that have been instituted by and for the benefit of European colonialism. Marìa Lugones proposes that decolonial feminism speaks to how "the colonial imposition of gender cuts across questions of ecology, economics, government, relations with the spirit world, and knowledge, as well as across everyday practices that either habituate us to take care of the world or to destroy it." Decolonial feminists like Karla Jessen Williamson and Rauna Kuokkanen have examined colonialism as a force that has imposed gender hierarchies on Indigenous women that have disempowered and fractured Indigenous communities and ways of life.

Decolonial love 

Decolonial love is a love established on our relationality that is directed toward the emancipation of community from the coloniality of power, including human and non-human beings. It was developed by Chicana feminist Chela Sandoval as a reformulation of love beyond individualist romantic notions of love. Decolonial love "demands a deep recognition of our humanity and mutual implacability in undoing colonial relations of power and oppression that lead to indifference, contempt, and dehumanization." It begins from within, as a love of one's humanity and for those who have resisted colonial violence in their pursuit of healing and liberation. Thinkers who speak to the concept state that it is rooted in Indigenous cosmologies, including In Lak'ech ("you are my other me"), where love is a relational and resisting act toward the coloniality of power.

Critiquing Western liberal democracy 
Moving beyond the critiques of enlightenment philosophy and modernity, decolonial critiques of democracy uncover how practices in democratic governance root themselves in colonial and racial rhetoric. Subhabrata Bobby Banerjee seeks to counter "hegemonic models of democracy that cannot address issues of inequality and colonial difference." 

Banerjee critiques western liberal democracy: "In liberal democracies colonial power becomes the epistemic basis of a privileged Eurocentric position that can explain culture and define the realities and identities of marginalized populations, while eliding power asymmetries inherent in the fixing of colonial difference.” He also extends this analysis against deliberative democracy, arguing that this political theory fails to take into account colonized forms of deliberation often discounted and silenced—including oral history, music production, and more—as well as how asymmetries of power are reproduced within political arenas.

Distinction from related ideas
Decoloniality is often conflated with postcolonialism, decolonization, and postmodernism. However, decolonial theorists draw clear distinctions.

Postcolonialism 
Postcolonialism is often mainstreamed into general oppositional practices by "people of color", "Third World intellectuals", or ethnic groups. Decoloniality—as both an analytic and a programmatic approach—is said to move "away and beyond the post-colonial" because "post-colonialism criticism and theory is a project of scholarly transformation within the academy".

This final point is debatable, as some postcolonial scholars consider postcolonial criticism and theory to be both an analytic (a scholarly, theoretical, and epistemic) project and a programmatic (a practical, political) stance.  This disagreement is an example of the ambiguity—"sometimes dangerous, sometimes confusing, and generally limited and unconsciously employed"—of the term "postcolonialism," which has been applied to analysis of colonial expansion and decolonization, in contexts such as Algeria, the 19th-century United States, and 19th-century Brazil.

Decolonial scholars consider the colonization of the Americas a precondition for postcolonial analysis. The seminal text of postcolonial studies, Orientalism by Edward Said, describes the nineteenth-century European invention of the Orient as a geographic region considered racially and culturally distinct from, and inferior to, Europe. However, without the European invention of the Americas in the sixteenth century, sometimes referred to as Occidentalism, the later invention of the Orient would have been impossible. This means that postcolonialism becomes problematic when applied to post-nineteenth-century Latin America.

Political decolonization
Decolonization is largely political and historical: the end of the period of territorial domination of lands primarily in the global south by European powers. Decolonial scholars contend that colonialism did not disappear with political decolonization.

It is important to note the vast differences in the histories, socioeconomics, and geographies of colonization in its various global manifestations. However, coloniality— meaning racialized and gendered socioeconomic and political stratification according to an invented Eurocentric standard—was common to all forms of colonization. Similarly, decoloniality in the form of challenges to this Eurocentric stratification manifested previous to de jure decolonization. Gandhi and Jinnah in India, Fanon in Algeria, Mandela in South Africa, and the early 20th-century Zapatistas in Mexico are all examples of decolonial projects that existed before decolonization.

Postmodernism

"Modernity" as a concept is complementary to coloniality. Coloniality is called "the darker side of western modernity". The problematic aspects of coloniality are often overlooked when describing the totality of Western society, whose advent is instead often framed as the introduction of modernity and rationality, a concept critiqued by post-modern thinkers. However, this critique is largely "limited and internal to European history and the history of European ideas". 

Although postmodern thinkers recognize the problematic nature of the notions of modernity and rationality, these thinkers often overlook the fact that modernity as a concept emerged when Europe defined itself as the center of the world. In this sense, those seen as part of the periphery are themselves part of Europe's self-definition.

To summarize, like modernity, postmodernity often reproduces the "Eurocentric fallacy" foundational to modernity. Therefore, rather than criticizing the terrors of modernity, decolonialism criticizes Eurocentric modernity and rationality because of the "irrational myth" that these conceal. Decolonial approaches thus seek to "politicise epistemology from the experiences of those on the 'border,' not to develop yet another epistemology of politics".

See also 
Anti-imperialism

References

Further reading
 
 LeVine, Mark 2005a: Overthrowing Geography: Jaffa, Tel Aviv and the Struggle for Palestine. Berkeley: University of California Press.
 LeVine, Mark 2005b: Why They Don't Hate Us: Lifting the Veil on the Axis of Evil. Oxford, UK: Oneworld Publications.
 Quijano, Aníbal and Immanuel Wallerstein 1992: Americanity as Concept: Or the Americas in the Modern World-System. International Social Science Journal 131: 549–557.
 Vallega, Alejandro A. 2015: Latin American Philosophy: from Identity to Radical Exteriority. Indiana University Press.
 Walsh, Catherine & Mignolo Walter (2018) On Decoloniality Duke University Press
 Walsh, Catherine.  (2012) "“Other” Knowledges,“Other” Critiques: Reflections on the Politics and Practices of Philosophy and Decoloniality in the “Other” America." TRANSMODERNITY: Journal of Peripheral Cultural Production of the Luso-Hispanic World 1.3.
 Wan-hua, Huang.  (2011) "The Process of Decoloniality of Taiwan Literature in the Early Postwar Period." Taiwan Research Journal 1: 006.
 Bhambra, G. (2012). Postcolonialism and decoloniality: A dialogue. In The Second ISA Forum of Sociology (August 1–4). Isaconf.
 Drexler-Dreis, J. (2013). Decoloniality as Reconciliation. Concilium: International Review of Theology-English Edition, (1), 115–122.
 Wanzer, D. A. (2012). Delinking Rhetoric, or Revisiting McGee's Fragmentation Thesis through Decoloniality. Rhetoric & Public Affairs, 15(4), 647–657.
 
 
 
  Chalmers, Gordon (2013) Indigenous as ’not-Indigenous' as ’Us'?: A dissident insider's views on pushing the bounds for what constitutes 'our mob'. Australian Indigenous Law Review, 17(2), pp. 47–55. http://search.informit.com.au/documentSummary;dn=900634481905301;res=IELIND
 Smith, Linda Tuhiwai (2012) Decolonizing Methodologies: Research and Indigenous Peoples (2nd edition). London: Zed Books.

Critical theory
Decolonization
International relations theory